Long Prairie is a town in Todd County, Minnesota, United States. The population was 3,458 at the 2010 census.  It is the county seat. and the oldest town in the County.

Geography
The Long Prairie River, flowing North, goes through the city. Lake Charlotte borders it on the South Venewitz Creek flows from Lake Charlotte and joins the Long Prairie River in the town.

U.S. Highway 71 and Minnesota State Highways 27 and 287 are three of the main routes in the city. Todd County Roads 5 and 38 originate in the town.

Long Prairie has a warm-summer humid continental climate (Koppen Dfb) with cold winters and generally warm summers.

History

Long Prairie's history dates back to the time when the land was inhabited first by the Sioux/Dakota and then Anishinaabe/ Ojibwe Native American tribes. In 1845, the U.S. government selected the location known as Long Prairie as a site for a USA Indian agency. An 1846 treaty with the Winnebago briefly resettled the nation in what is now Long Prairie, from the Neutral Ground in northeast Iowa to which they had been removed in the 1830s as white settlers claimed and began developing their ancestral lands in Wisconsin and Illinois. A subsequent treaty in 1855 again resettled the Hochunk in southern Minnesota.

Long Prairie was platted in 1867, and named after the Long Prairie River.

Demographics

2010 census
As of the census of 2010, there were 3,458 people, 1,290 households, and 816 families living in the city. The racial makeup of the city was 81.8% White, 1.0% African American, 0.6% Native American, 0.6% Asian, 1.2% Pacific Islander, 12.7% from other races, and 2.1% from two or more races. Hispanic or Latino of any race were 29.9% of the population.

There were 1,290 households, of which 33.6% had children under the age of 18 living with them, 48.7% were married couples living together, 9.8% had a female householder with no husband present, 4.8% had a male householder with no wife present, and 36.7% were non-families. 32.7% of all households were made up of individuals, and 18.1% had someone living alone who was 65 years of age or older. The average household size was 2.58 and the average family size was 3.29.

The median age in the city was 34.1 years. 27.8% of residents were under the age of 18; 9.6% were between the ages of 18 and 24; 24.2% were from 25 to 44; 20.3% were from 45 to 64; and 18% were 65 years of age or older. The gender makeup of the city was 48.4% male and 51.6% female.

2000 census
At the 2000 census, there were 3,040 people, 1,229 households and 769 families living in the city. The racial makeup of the city was 93.06% White, 0.07% African American, 1.74% Native American, 0.10% Asian, 0.03% Pacific Islander, 4.28% from other races, and 0.72% from two or more races. Hispanic or Latino of any race were 9.38% of the population.

There were 1,229 households, of which 29.6% had children under the age of 18 living with them, 48.6% were married couples living together, 9.8% had a female householder with no husband present, and 37.4% were non-families. 33.2% of all households were made up of individuals, and 19.1% had someone living alone who was 65 years of age or older.  The average household size was about 2.36 and the average family size was 3.01.

25.4% of residents were under the age of 18, 9.2% from 18 to 24, 24.5% from 25 to 44, 19.8% from 45 to 64, and 21.2% who were 65 years of age or older. The median age was 38 years. For every 100 females, there were 88.0 males. For every 100 females age 18 and over, there were 85.1 males.

The median household income was $28,237, and the median family income was $35,699. Males had a median income of $31,359 versus $20,152 for females. The per capita income for the city was $14,386. About 13.8% of families and 16.4% of the population were below the poverty line, including 23.1% of those under age 18 and 13.5% of those age 65 or over.

Notable people
Barry Bennett, former NFL defensive lineman 
Charles P. Davis, United States Army soldier awarded the Medal of Honor for actions during the Philippine–American War
Jodi Huisentruit, television news anchor in Iowa who disappeared in 1995 and was later declared dead

Tom Barnard, the host of the KQRS Morning Show and voice over artist.  Born in Long Prairie, but raised in North Minneapolis, Minnesota
Jacob Wetterling,  Eleven year old boy abducted and murdered on October 22, 1989. Born in Long Prairie, but raised in St. Joseph, Minnesota.

References

External links

 City Website
 Long Prairie – Visitor Information site
 Long Prairie / Grey Eagle Schools site
 Long Prairie Country Club
 Prairie Fest Community Festival
 Feshir, Reham, In Long Prairie, immigrants helped avert town's decline.  MRP News, November 15, 2015

Cities in Minnesota
Cities in Todd County, Minnesota
County seats in Minnesota